The Khyber Pakhtunkhwa Department of Excise & Taxation is concerned with Excise & Taxation in the Pakistan province of Khyber Pakhtunkhwa. It is headed by the Khyber Pakhtunkhwa Minister of Excise & Taxation, who is a member of the Chief Minister's Cabinet.

Mr. Mian Jamshed-ud-Din was appointed as Minister of Excise & Taxation by Chief Minister of KP Pervez Khattak on May 7, 2014.

History 

The department was created on August 14, 1973. This department's main purpose is to create jobs, promote Excise and Taxation growth, encourage sustainable development and improve standards of living for all citizens of Khyber Pakhtunkhwa. The department is currently headed by Minister Mian Jamshed-ud-Din.

Organization 

The Department is under the control and supervision of a Khyber Pakhtunkhwa Minister of Excise and Taxation, a political appointee of the Chief Minister of Khyber Pakhtunkhwa. The Excise and Taxation Minister is assisted in managing the Department by a Secretary of Excise and Taxation, also appointed by the Chief Minister, who assumes the duties of the Minister in his absence.

Structure 

 Minister of Excise and Taxation
 Secretary of Excise and Taxation
 Additional Secretary of Excise and Taxation
 Deputy Secretary of Excise and Taxation
 SO Administration
 SO Establishment
 SO Litigation
 Tax Analyst
 SO Tax

Duties 
The duties of the department revolve around Excise and Taxation conditions and concerns in the Khyber Pakhtunkhwa. This includes advising the Chief Minister on matters of Excise and Taxation. It strives to administer the department of Excise and Taxation to carry out approved programs and make the public aware of the objectives of the department.

List of Ministers

References 

Departments of Government of Khyber Pakhtunkhwa
Ministries established in 1973
1973 establishments in Pakistan
Taxation in Pakistan
Tax administration